Longcroft is a small village in the Falkirk council area in Scotland. The main features of the village include the Masonic Arms pub and hotel.

Notable former residents 
 Thomas Ferguson, footballer (Falkirk)
 Danny Malloy, footballer (Dundee, Cardiff City, Doncaster)

References

External links

Canmore - Longcroft, Kilsyth Road, War Memorial site record

Villages in Falkirk (council area)